Murtygit is a rural locality (a settlement) in Murtygitsky Selsoviet of Tyndinsky District, Amur Oblast, Russia. The population was 340 as of 2018. There are 3 streets.

Geography 
Murtygit is located 126 km southwest of Tynda (the district's administrative centre) by road. Anosovsky is the nearest rural locality.

References 

Rural localities in Tyndinsky District